Liang Jing (born July 17, 1972) is a Chinese actress.

Film
Drunken Hero (2002)
Sunflower (2005)
Karmic Mahjong (2006)
All Apologies (2012)
The Chef, the Actor, the Scoundrel (2013)
Journey (2015)
Mr. Six (2015)
The New Year's Eve of Old Lee (2016)
Run for Love (2016)
S.M.A.R.T. Chase (2017)
The Secret of Immortal Code (2018)
The Island (2018)
My People, My Country  (2019) 
The Eight Hundred (2019)

References

21st-century Chinese actresses
20th-century Chinese actresses
Chinese film actresses
Chinese television actresses
Actresses from Fujian
1972 births
Living people